The Ancora String Quartet is a string quartet based in Madison, Wisconsin.  The quartet was founded in Madison in 2000.  Its musicians studied at some of the leading music schools in the United States, including the New England Conservatory of Music, the Eastman School of Music, the Indiana University School of Music, and the University of Texas-Austin; they also serve as members of the Madison Symphony Orchestra, the Wisconsin Chamber Orchestra, the Madison Bach Musicians, and other groups.

Members

The current members of the Ancora String Quartet are:

 Wes Luke, first violin
 Robin Ryan, second violin
 Marika Fischer Hoyt, viola
 Dr. Benjamin Whitcomb, cello

Former members of the quartet include Leanne Kelso League, Laura Burns, Cynthia Bittar, and Eleanor Bartsch (first violin) and Susan Bestul (cello).

History

The Ancora String Quartet became the String Quartet In Residence at the First Unitarian Society of Madison in 2006. They established a recital season there, garnering praise from music critics. They have also appeared twice on Wisconsin Public Radio's Sunday Afternoon Live From the Chazen series, broadcast live statewide, on Jan. 14, 2007 and April 6, 2008.

In September 2008 the Ancora String Quartet launched its 2008-2009 Critics' Choice Season, featuring recital programs selected especially for the quartet by local music critics.

Notes

External links
 Ancora String Quartet website
 Review by John Barker in Isthmus The Ancora String Quartet pit Beethoven vs. Tchaikovsky
 Article by Sandy Rucker-Tabachnick in Isthmus Local chamber groups thrive as the classical music world downsizes
 Audio recording of an interview with the Ancora String Quartet on Wisconsin Public Radio's program The Midday (May 25, 2007).

American string quartets
Musical groups from Wisconsin
Musical groups established in 2000